The Lizzie Robinson House, located at 2864 Corby Street in North Omaha, Nebraska, United States, is the location of the first Church of God in Christ congregation in the state. This was a Pentecostal denomination founded in the late 19th century in Lexington, Mississippi, by Charles Price Jones and Charles Harrison Mason; the latter of whom led the church for decades.

Initially most of the COGIC members and churches were in the Deep South states. During the Great Migration of the first half of the twentieth century, African-American migrants to northern cities established new COGIC congregations across the country.

Built in 1910, the house is listed on the National Register of Historic Places on February 25, 1993, and was designated an Omaha landmark on June 9, 1992.

About
Edward and Lizzie Robinson founded the first Church of God in Christ in the state of Nebraska after they moved to Omaha in 1916 from the South. The Robinsons lived here with their daughter, Ida Baker, from 1916 through 1924. According to the City of Omaha, "Mrs. Robinson is significant historically for her role as organizer of the women’s ministry for the Church of God in Christ, the largest African-American Pentecostal denomination in the world."

See also
History of North Omaha, Nebraska
History of Nebraska
List of churches in Omaha, Nebraska
Church of God in Christ

References

African-American history in Omaha, Nebraska
Christianity in Omaha, Nebraska
History of North Omaha, Nebraska
Houses completed in 1910
Houses on the National Register of Historic Places in Omaha, Nebraska
Landmarks in North Omaha, Nebraska
Omaha Landmarks